OFI may refer to:

 Overseas Filipino Investors, Filipino expatriates who contribute to the economy of the Philippines through remittances, buying property, and creating businesses
 OFI Crete, a Greek association football club based on the island of Crete
 O.F.I. (sports club), a Greek multi-sports club based on the island of Crete
 OFI Sunday, a UK entertainment show hosted by Chris Evans
 OFI (web standard), the OpenURL Framework for Context-Sensitive Services (ANSI/NISO Z39.88-2004)